The 2017–18 Scottish Championship (known as the Ladbrokes Championship for sponsorship reasons) was the 23rd season in the current format of 10 teams in the second tier of Scottish football. The fixtures were published on 23 June 2017.

Ten teams contested the league: Brechin City, Dumbarton, Dundee United, Dunfermline Athletic, Falkirk, Greenock Morton, Inverness CT, Livingston, Queen of the South and St Mirren.

St Mirren won the league title, and promotion to the Premiership, after a 0–0 draw with Livingston on 14 April 2018.

Brechin City became the first team in 126 years to go through a Scottish league season without a win. Their total of 4 points was the lowest ever recorded in the Scottish second tier, the lowest in the three points for a win era and the joint-lowest in any Scottish division.

Prize money
In April 2018, the SPFL confirmed the prize money to be allocated to the league members at the conclusion of the competitions. The Championship winners would receive £533,000 with a total pot of £24.5 million to be distributed across the four divisions.

Teams
The following teams have changed division since the 2016–17 season.

To Championship

Promoted from Scottish League One
 Brechin City
 Livingston

Relegated from Scottish Premiership
 Inverness Caledonian Thistle

From Championship

Relegated to Scottish League One
Ayr United
Raith Rovers

Promoted to Scottish Premiership
Hibernian

Stadia and locations

Personnel and kits

Managerial changes

League summary

League table

Positions by Round
The table lists the positions of teams after each week of matches. In order to preserve chronological progress, any postponed matches are not included in the round at which they were originally scheduled, but added to the full round they were played immediately afterwards. For example, if a match is scheduled for matchday 13, but then postponed and played between days 16 and 17, it will be added to the standings for day 16.

Source: 
Updated: 28 April 2018

Results
Teams play each other four times, twice in the first half of the season (home and away) and twice in the second half of the season (home and away), making a total of 180 games, with each team playing 36.

First half of season

Second half of season

Season statistics

Scoring

Top scorers

Hat-tricks

Discipline

Player

Yellow cards

Red cards

Club

Yellow cards

Red cards

Attendances

Awards

Monthly awards

Championship play-offs
The second bottom team will enter into a 4-team playoff with the 2nd-4th placed teams in League One.

Semi-finals

First leg

Second leg

Final

First leg

Second leg

References

Scottish Championship seasons
2
2
Scot